Phyllanthus distichus is a species of flowering plant in the family Phyllanthaceae, native to the Hawaiian Islands.

References

distichus
Flora of Hawaii
Plants described in 1832